Harvey Forbes Fierstein (born June 6, 1954) is an American actor, playwright and screenwriter. He is best known for his theater work in Torch Song Trilogy and Hairspray and movie roles in Mrs. Doubtfire, Independence Day, and as the voice of Yao in Mulan and Mulan II. Fierstein won two Tony Awards, Best Actor in a Play and Best Play, for Torch Song Trilogy. He received his third Tony Award, Best Book of a Musical, for the musical La Cage aux Folles and his fourth, the Tony Award for Best Actor in a Musical, for playing Edna Turnblad in Hairspray. Fierstein also wrote the book for the Tony Award–winning musicals Kinky Boots, Newsies, and Tony Award–nominated, Drama League Award-winner A Catered Affair. He was inducted into the American Theater Hall of Fame in 2007.

For his role on the television show Cheers, he was nominated for a Primetime Emmy Award for Outstanding Supporting Actor in a Comedy Series.

Early life and education
Fierstein was born in Bensonhurst, Brooklyn, New York City, the son of Jacqueline Harriet ( Gilbert), a school librarian, and Irving Fierstein, a handkerchief manufacturer. He was raised Jewish, but later became an atheist.

Fierstein attended High School of Art and Design and received a BFA from the Pratt Institute in 1973. He began working in the theater as a founding member of The Gallery Players of Park Slope before being cast in Andy Warhol's only play, Pork.

Fierstein's distinctive gravelly voice is a result of an overdeveloped vestibular fold in his vocal cords, essentially giving him a "double voice" when he speaks. Prior to puberty, Fierstein was a soprano in a professional boys' choir.

Career

Fierstein is best known for the play and film Torch Song Trilogy, which he wrote and starred in both off-Broadway (with a young Matthew Broderick) and on Broadway (with Estelle Getty and Fisher Stevens). The 1982 Broadway production won him two Tony Awards, for Best Play and Best Actor in a Play; two Drama Desk Awards, for Outstanding New Play and Outstanding Actor in a Play; and the Theatre World Award. The film adaptation earned him an Independent Spirit Award nomination as Best Male Lead.

Fierstein also wrote the book for La Cage aux Folles (1983), winning another Tony Award, this time for Best Book of a Musical, and a Drama Desk nomination for Outstanding Book. Legs Diamond, his 1988 collaboration with Peter Allen, was a critical and commercial failure, closing after 72 previews and 64 performances, but the songs live on in Peter Allen's biographical musical, The Boy from Oz.

In 2007, Fierstein wrote the book to the musical A Catered Affair in which he also starred. After tryouts at San Diego's Old Globe Theatre in September 2007, the show opened on Broadway April 17, 2008. It received 12 Drama Desk Award nominations and won the Drama League Award for Distinguished Production of a Musical.

Fierstein wrote the book for the stage musical Newsies, along with Alan Menken (music) and Jack Feldman (lyrics). The musical opened on Broadway in March 2012. Fierstein was nominated for the Tony Award for Book of a Musical.

Fierstein wrote the book for a stage musical version of the film Kinky Boots with music and lyrics by Cyndi Lauper. After a fall 2012 run at the Bank of America Theatre in Chicago, it opened at the Al Hirschfeld Theatre on Broadway in April 2013. The musical was nominated for thirteen 2013 Tony Awards and won six, including best musical.

Fierstein's play Casa Valentina was produced on Broadway by the Manhattan Theatre Club at the Samuel J. Friedman Theatre. The play opened in April 2014. It was directed by Joe Mantello, with a cast that featured Patrick Page, John Cullum, and Mare Winningham.

In April 2016, Fierstein, along with his Kinky Boots collaborator Cyndi Lauper, was honored with a star on the Hollywood Walk of Fame.

In 2019 Fierstein wrote and starred in Bella Bella, a one-person play about New York Congresswoman Bella Abzug. It premiered at Manhattan Theatre Club's Stage One at City Center.

His other playwriting credits include Safe Sex, Spookhouse, and Forget Him.

Fierstein wrote the teleplay for the December 3, 2015 NBC TV broadcast of The Wiz Live!, featuring Stephanie Mills as Aunt Em, Queen Latifah as The Wiz, and David Alan Grier as the Lion. The teleplay is an adaptation of The Wiz Broadway production which ran from October 1974 until January 1979.

Fierstein then wrote the teleplay for, and starred in, the 2016 NBC TV broadcast of Hairspray Live! with Ariana Grande, Jennifer Hudson, Kristin Chenoweth, and Martin Short.

As one of the first openly gay celebrities in the United States, Fierstein helped make gay and lesbian life into viable subjects for contemporary drama "with no apologies and no climactic suicides".

In addition to his theatrical work, Fierstein has authored op-eds for The New York Times, HuffPost, and PBS.  His I Was Better Last Night: A Memoir was released in 2022 and quickly became a New York Times Bestseller.

Acting
Fierstein made his acting debut at La MaMa, E.T.C. in Andy Warhol's only play, Pork. Fierstein continued to appear at La MaMa and other venues, but also having some aspirations to become a painter, he enrolled at the Pratt Institute in Brooklyn. He received a Bachelor of Fine Arts (BFA) from Pratt in 1973. Fierstein appeared three times in The Haunted Host by Robert Patrick: in Boston in 1975, at La MaMa, and then off-Broadway in 1991. In addition to Torch Song Trilogy, La Cage aux Folles, and A Catered Affair, Fierstein's Broadway acting credits include playing the mother, Edna Turnblad, in Hairspray (2002), for which he won a Tony Award for Best Leading Actor in a Musical. He later replaced Alfred Molina as Tevye in the 2004 revival of Fiddler on the Roof.

Besides his leading role in the film version of Torch Song Trilogy co-starring Matthew Broderick and Anne Bancroft, Fierstein's film roles include Woody Allen's Bullets over Broadway and Merv Green in Death to Smoochy, in addition to parts in Garbo Talks, Duplex, Kull the Conqueror, and Independence Day. He narrated the documentary The Times of Harvey Milk, for which he won a News & Documentary Emmy Award. He also voiced the role of Yao in Disney's animated feature Mulan, a role he later reprised for the video game Kingdom Hearts II and the direct-to-DVD sequel Mulan II.

In 1993, Harvey Fierstein co-starred with Mara Wilson, Lisa Jakub, Matthew Lawrence, Sally Field, and Robin Williams in Mrs. Doubtfire.

On television, Fierstein was praised for his 1990 role as the voice of Karl, Homer Simpson's assistant, in the "Simpson and Delilah" episode of "The Simpsons" and the voice of Elmer in the 1999 HBO special based on his children's book The Sissy Duckling, which won the Humanitas Prize for Children's Animation. In 1994, Fierstein became the first openly gay actor to play a principal gay character in a television series when he appeared as fashion designer Dennis Sinclair in the short-lived CBS series Daddy's Girls. Additional credits include Miami Vice; Murder, She Wrote; the Showtime television movie Common Ground (which he also wrote); and Cheers, which earned him an Emmy Award nomination for Outstanding Supporting Actor in a Comedy Series. He sang a tribute to Katie Couric on "Today" on May 31, 2006, her last day as anchor. He appeared as Heat Miser in the live-action remake of The Year Without a Santa Claus in December 2006. More recent television performances include an episode of Family Guy and a second-season episode of the series Nurse Jackie. He also provided the voice-over for Lily in the episode "Last Cigarette Ever" of How I Met Your Mother, when she gets a sore throat due to smoking.

Fierstein returned to the theatre when he reprised the role of Tevye, replacing an injured Chaim Topol, in the national tour of Fiddler on the Roof starting in December 2009. On February 15, 2011, he replaced Douglas Hodge as Albin/Zaza in the Broadway revival of La Cage aux Folles playing opposite Jeffrey Tambor as Georges, although days later Tambor pulled out, which the producers have stated was due to "complications from a recent hip surgery"; Christopher Sieber quickly replaced Tambor. The show closed on May 1, 2011, after playing 433 performances and 15 previews.

Fierstein wrote and starred in the solo monologue play Bella Bella, about Bella Abzug. The play opened off-Broadway at the Manhattan Theatre Club's City Center Stage 1 on October 1, 2019, directed by Kimberly Senior.

Personal life

Gender identity 
Speaking with People magazine in February 2022 to promote his memoir I Was Better Last Night, Fierstein stated, "I'm still confused as to whether I'm a man or a woman," and that as a child he often wondered if he'd been born in the wrong body. "When I was a kid, I was attracted to men. I didn't feel like a boy was supposed to feel. Then I found out about gay. So that was enough for me for then." The interview also noted his ease at playing both Tevye in Fiddler on the Roof and Edna Turnblad in Hairspray. He avoided identifying as non-binary in the interview, saying he had thought about it a lot and "it's the term that bothers me", but concluded that "I don't think I've missed anything by not making up my mind". On the LGBTQ&A podcast the following month, Fierstein said, "I'm comfortable being me and if I ask myself, 'Would you want to transition?' The answer's no."

Theater acting credits

Filmography

Film

Television

Video games

Awards and nominations

See also
 LGBT culture in New York City
 List of LGBT people from New York City

References

External links

Review of Torch Song Trilogy, with information about Fierstein
TonyAwards.com Interview with Harvey Fierstein
 Donald L. Brooks' memoir of early casting of Fierstein and commissioning and directing Fierstein's first play.
Harvey Fierstein papers (MS 1864). Manuscripts and Archives, Yale University Library. 

1952 births
20th-century American dramatists and playwrights
American male film actors
Jewish American atheists
American male musical theatre actors
American male stage actors
American male television actors
American male voice actors
American male video game actors
American male screenwriters
American drag queens
Drama Desk Award winners
American gay actors
Jewish American male actors
Male actors from New York City
Jewish American dramatists and playwrights
Gay Jews
LGBT people from New York (state)
Musicians from Brooklyn
Writers from Brooklyn
People from Ridgefield, Connecticut
Pratt Institute alumni
Tony Award winners
Gay dramatists and playwrights
Gay screenwriters
Living people
20th-century American male actors
21st-century American male actors
21st-century American dramatists and playwrights
American male dramatists and playwrights
High School of Art and Design alumni
American LGBT dramatists and playwrights
American LGBT screenwriters
20th-century American male writers
21st-century American male writers
American gay writers